Carroll J. Gaddis, Jr. (born August 12, 1985) is a former American football safety. He was drafted by the Philadelphia Eagles in the fifth round of the 2007 NFL Draft. He played college football at Clemson.

Gaddis has also been a member of the Atlanta Falcons.

Early life

College career
Gaddis was the first non-starter in Clemson history to have an interception in three consecutive games. At Clemson, Gaddis held Georgia Tech receiver Calvin Johnson to zero catches for the only time in his career. Gaddis also played baseball at Clemson.

Professional career

Pre-draft
Gaddis ran a 4.43 at Clemson University's Pro Day and had a 39.5 inch vertical leap.

Philadelphia Eagles
Gaddis was drafted by the Philadelphia Eagles in the fifth round of the 2007 NFL Draft. He was released before the start of the 2007 season.

Atlanta Falcons
Gaddis was signed by the Atlanta Falcons, but did not see any game action in the two seasons he was on the team. He was released prior to the start of the 2008 season.

External links
Clemson Tigers bio

1985 births
Living people
Players of American football from Mississippi
Sportspeople from Hattiesburg, Mississippi
American football cornerbacks
American football safeties
Clemson Tigers football players
Philadelphia Eagles players
Atlanta Falcons players
Clemson Tigers baseball players